The Indie Book Awards are a group of awards presented annually by Australian Independent Booksellers. They were established in 2008 in order to recognise and reward the best in Australian writing, chosen by independent booksellers in Australia.

, there are six categories, with an overall winner chosen as Indie Book of the Year:
Indie Book of the Year Fiction
Indie Book of the Year Non-Fiction
Indie Book of the Year Debut Fiction
Indie Book of the Year Children’s
Indie Book of the Year Young Adult
Indie Book of the Year Illustrated Non-Fiction

A longlist of titles is compiled and announced in December of each year and a shortlist (24 titles, four per category) are announced in late January.

The winners of the Indie Book Awards are widely reported on by various media, including libraries and publishing-related websites.

References

Awards established in 2008
2008 establishments in Australia
English-language literary awards
Australian fiction awards
Australian non-fiction book awards